Ever Amarilla (born August 13, 1984) is a Paraguayan footballer who played in Chile as well as in Paraguay.

References
 
 

1984 births
Living people
Paraguayan footballers
Paraguayan expatriate footballers
Curicó Unido footballers
Puerto Montt footballers
Primera B de Chile players
Chilean Primera División players
Expatriate footballers in Chile
Association football forwards